The Carver Residential Historic District is a national historic district located at Carver, Richmond, Virginia. The district encompasses 312 contributing buildings and 1 contributing site located west of downtown Richmond.  The primarily residential area developed starting in the mid-19th century. The buildings are in a variety of popular 19th-century and early 20th-century architectural styles, including Gothic Revival and Greek Revival. Notable buildings include the Hardin Davis House (1842), Amanda Ragland House (1843), Reuben Lacy House (1859), Rueben T. Hill House (1900), George Washington Carver Elementary School (1887), Moore Street Baptist Church (1909), Baughman Brothers/Biggs Antique Company building (1924), and the T&E Laundry Company Building (c. 1915).

It was added to the National Register of Historic Places in 2002, with a boundary increase in 2006.

References

Historic districts on the National Register of Historic Places in Virginia
Gothic Revival architecture in Virginia
Greek Revival architecture in Virginia
Buildings and structures in Richmond, Virginia
National Register of Historic Places in Richmond, Virginia